Battle: Los Angeles is a first-person shooter developed by Saber Interactive and published by Konami for Microsoft Windows (Steam), PlayStation Network, and Xbox Live Arcade in 2011. It was released to conicide with the release of the 2011 film of the same name. Aaron Eckhart reprised his role for the game. Players assume the role of Corporal Lee Imlay throughout the game.

Reception

The game received "unfavorable" reviews on all platforms according to the review aggregation website Metacritic.

Since its release, the Xbox 360 version sold 60,076 units worldwide by the end of 2011.

References

External links
 

2011 video games
First-person shooters
Konami games
PlayStation 3 games
PlayStation Network games
Saber Interactive games
Video games based on films
Video games developed in the United States
Windows games
Xbox 360 games
Xbox 360 Live Arcade games
Single-player video games